Rambani is an Indo-Aryan language variety spoken in Ramban district, which is located in the mountainous parts of the Jammu region of Jammu and Kashmir, India.

In P.K. Kaul's view, Rambani belongs to the Western Pahari group, and has been influenced by languages like Kashmiri, Poguli and Dogri.

Rambani is likely endangered. It is spoken by relatively few people, but the exact number of speakers is unknown. In the 1981 census, there were only 120 people who identified their language as Rambani, but this number is not reliable given that in the area there were sizeable census returns for "Pahari", a much broader term that could conceivably have been chosen by some speakers of Rambani.

Grammar sketches of Rambani are found in T. Grahame Bailey's 1908 The Languages of the Northern Himalayas and in G.A. Grierson's Linguistic Survey of India.

References

Bibliography 

Indo-Aryan languages
Languages of Jammu and Kashmir